Naomi Eva Lindstrom (born November 21, 1950, in Chicago) is an American literary critic and translator who has published books and articles on Latin American narrative and poetry and Jewish writing from Latin America.

Background
Lindstrom studied at the University of Chicago and is the Gale Family Foundation Professor in Jewish Arts and Culture and Professor of Spanish and Portuguese at the University of Texas at Austin, where she is co-director of the Gale Collaborative on Jewish Life in the Americas at the Schusterman Center for Jewish Studies. Lindstrom is the daughter of the noted sociologist Frederick B. Lindstrom (1915–1998), best known as a student of popular culture and historian of the Chicago school (sociology), and the two collaborated and co-authored conference papers and articles.

Career
Elements of sociological thought influence Naomi Lindstrom's literary criticism, especially her 1989 book Jewish Issues in Argentine Literature and her 1998 study The Social Conscience of Latin American Writing. Although her faculty appointment is in a language and literature department, she has occasionally published work in social science journals and has participated in sociology conferences. During the latter part of her career, Lindstrom has increasingly focused on the field of Latin American Jewish studies, both in her research and in her administrative roles. Since 1996, as part of her work with the Latin American Jewish Studies Association (LAJSA), she has managed lajsa-list, a listserv on Latin American Jewish topics;  the URL is lajsa-list@utilists.utexas.edu. On the LAJSA website (www.lajsa.org), she maintains a continually updated registry of dissertations and theses, both completed and in progress, on Latin American Jewish topics and an archive of resources for teaching courses in both Sephardic Studies and Latin American Jewish Studies. In 2012 Lindstrom was awarded the President's Associates Teaching Excellence Award at the University of Texas. She was the general organizer of the International Research Conference of the Latin American Jewish Studies Association held June 9–11, 2013 at the University of Texas and co-organizer of two successive symposia on research into Jewish Life in the Americas held November 1–2, 2015 at the University of Texas and July 16–17, 2019 at the University of British Columbia, Vancouver. Lindstrom is also a literary translator and has been involved in the effort to make the novels of Roberto Arlt (Argentina, 1900–1942) available in English.

Selected works
Arlt, Roberto. The Seven Madmen. Novel. Translated from the Spanish by Naomi Lindstrom. Minneapolis: River Boat Press, 2018.
Lindstrom, Naomi.  Early Spanish American Narrative.  Austin:  University of Texas Press, 2004.
Lindstrom, Naomi.  The Social Conscience of Latin American Writing.  Austin: University of Texas Press, 1998.
Lindstrom, Naomi.  Twentieth-Century Spanish American Fiction.  Austin:  University of Texas Press, 1994.
Lindstrom, Naomi.  Jewish Issues in Argentine Literature:  From Gerchunoff to Szichman.  Columbia, MO:  University of Missouri Press, 1989.

References

External links
Latin American Jewish Studies Association

American literary critics
Women literary critics
American people of German-Jewish descent
American people of Swedish descent
University of Texas at Austin faculty
Writers from Chicago
1950 births
Living people
University of Chicago alumni
20th-century American women writers
20th-century American non-fiction writers
21st-century American women writers
American women non-fiction writers
21st-century American non-fiction writers
American women academics
American women critics